Maheshwara Engineering College (MEC) Formerly known as Jatipita College of Engineering is located in Patancheru, Hyderabad. The college was established in the year 1999 as the technical institutes and offers undergraduate and postgraduate degree in various programmes. The college is affiliated with the Jawaharlal Nehru Technological University and is approved by AICTE, a Council of the Government of India, for offering technical degrees.

Programmes

Undergrduate

Postgraduate
 Master of Technology (M.Tech)
 Master of Business Administration (MBA)
 Master of Computer Application (MCA)

References

1999 establishments in Andhra Pradesh
Educational institutions established in 1999
Engineering colleges in Hyderabad, India